Inés Bryan, in full Inés Xiomara Bryan Casey, was a medic and politician from the Dominican Republic. She died on 28 December 2019 from a heart attack.

Bryan had a doctorate in medicine. She was secretary-general of the Dominican Medic College; she served as deputy for San Pedro de Macorís Province since 16 August 2016 and presided the Chamber's Permanent Committee on Social Security.

References

External links 

2019 deaths
Date of birth missing
Place of birth missing
Afro-Dominican (Dominican Republic)
Dominican Republic medical doctors
Dominican Republic people of Cocolo descent
Members of the Chamber of Deputies of the Dominican Republic
Social Christian Reformist Party politicians
Women members of the Congress of the Dominican Republic
21st-century Dominican Republic women politicians
21st-century Dominican Republic politicians
Year of birth missing